Vangueriopsis shimbaensis is a species of flowering plants in the family Rubiaceae. It is endemic to Kenya. It is morphologically related to Vangueriopsis longiflora from Tanzania.

References

External links 
 World Checklist of Rubiaceae

shim
Endemic flora of Kenya
Endangered flora of Africa